Monroeville Mall is a shopping mall located in the municipality of Monroeville, Pennsylvania, east of Pittsburgh. It is located along heavily traveled U.S. Route 22 Business (US 22 Bus.) near the junction of Interstate 376 (I-376) and the Monroeville interchange of the Pennsylvania Turnpike. It was completed in 1969, extensively renovated and expanded in 2003–2004, and includes Barnes & Noble, Cinemark Theatres, Dick's Sporting Goods, JCPenney, and Macy's as anchor tenants. It is one of two CBL-owned malls in the Pittsburgh area, the other being Westmoreland Mall in Greensburg.

Adjacent to Monroeville Mall, several major shopping centers including the Miracle Mile Shopping Center, well-known national retailers and restaurants can be found along the U.S. Route 22 commercial corridor, the biggest such concentration of retailers and other commercial businesses in the eastern environs of the Pittsburgh Metropolitan Area. It is located at Mall Circle Drive, across from Monroeville Convention Center, venue of the Pittsburgh Comicon, a comic book convention, from 2009 to 2014.

With 150 stores, Monroeville Mall is currently the eighth largest shopping mall in Pennsylvania.

The mall is famous for being the filming location of the 1978 George A. Romero horror film Dawn of the Dead.

History 
Before the 1950s postwar migration movement, Monroeville was predominantly a rural farming area. The opening of the Pennsylvania Turnpike in the early 1950s followed by completion of Interstate 376 (Parkway East) in the early 1960s would expedite the growth of Monroeville and the eastern suburbs. In November 1954, the Miracle Mile Shopping Center opened for business with numerous shops and eateries. As the novelty of shopping malls made them increasingly popular in the 1960s, residents of Monroeville and the eastern suburbs shopped at the now-defunct Eastland Mall in nearby North Versailles, or at Greengate Mall (now demolished and rebuilt as Greengate Centre) in Greensburg, Westmoreland County.

Proposal 
In the mid-1960s, Don-Mark Realty (later Oxford Development Company) proposed building the largest shopping mall in the United States in the form of Monroeville Mall. For the development, Don-Mark acquired a  tract known as Harper's Mine. Despite local residents questioning whether the land was indeed a prime location for development, Don-Mark was confident that the site was perfect for the proposed mall. By 1966, grading equipment would begin leveling part of the massive site in preparation for the mall's construction. Construction on the $30 million mall would begin in 1967 and last for two years. Surrounding the mall, the massive parking lots were paved and spaced to accommodate 6,500 vehicles.

Opening 
On Tuesday, May 13, 1969, the  Monroeville Mall opened its doors with Gimbels and Joseph Horne Co. at opposite ends and JCPenney in the middle. The five and dime G. C. Murphy store provided a lower-price alternative for shoppers on the lower level. The mall contained 125 stores on two levels and featured the Ice Palace, a skating rink. Another unique feature was the location of a local Italian restaurant directly adjacent to the rink, with large picture windows in its dining rooms that gave patrons direct views of skaters on the rink. The mall's opening would contribute to the eventual decline and closure of the East Hills Shopping Center in nearby Penn Hills, a smaller outdoor mall also anchored by Horne's. It would also affect business at the nearby Miracle Mile Shopping Center, which was greatly impacted following the relocation of its JCPenney store to the Monroeville Mall, although business would gradually level out over time.

Mall amenities 
The mall was decorated with fountains and plant life that flourished under enormous skylights. The Gimbels court of the mall featured a large yellow clock tower that housed 12 animated puppets, each one representing an ethnic group in the Pittsburgh area. One puppet performed every hour, and all performed together at 1pm and 6pm. The court at the Horne's end of the mall had a large, circular fountain, surrounded by a seating area. The store selection in the mall ranged from high fashion to hardware. There was a bank, several places to eat, pharmacies, pubs and even a ministry center, as developers had intended on making the mall into an indoor "town center" for the Monroeville community.

Surrounding developments and in-mall projects 
With Monroeville Mall fully operational, the areas surrounding the mall began to develop as well. Outparcels such as a movie theater, a Marriott hotel, a freestanding Montgomery Ward store, and a number of retailers, auto service centers and restaurants were subsequently built during the 1970s. The mall annex would also be developed directly behind the mall and feature an A&P supermarket, among other businesses. The A&P closed in 1992, and was replaced by a Burlington Coat Factory in 1993, Dick's Sporting Goods in 1995, OfficeMax in 1998, and LensCrafters eye shop in the fall of 1999. The Greater Pittsburgh Merchandise Mart, the predecessor to the much larger Pittsburgh ExpoMart of Monroeville, was developed as a facility for the display of goods by representatives of various manufacturers. It would be replaced by the larger facility in 1981 and redeveloped for the now defunct Borders bookstore which opened in January 1993. In February 1984, much to the dismay of local residents, the Ice Palace was replaced by a food court. In later years, most of the mall's decorative ponds and bridges would be replaced by numerous carts and kiosks. In the early 1990s, the distinctive clock tower was dismantled in lieu of a stage, which has since been removed, while the fountain at the opposite end was removed in the early 2000s for a children's play area, themed to Mister Rogers' Neighborhood. In 2009, the ExpoMart was converted into office space and a smaller convention center opened along Mall Boulevard in a renovated former Wickes Furniture store.

Renovation and expansion 
The largest renovation and expansion project ever at Monroeville Mall was completed in 2003–2004, when CBL & Associates Properties purchased it. The main entrance area fronting the mall was redeveloped into an  lifestyle center called The District. Inside the mall, extensive upgrades to the mall's entrances, restrooms and common areas were completed, with new escalators, lighting fixtures, railings, flooring and seating among the new amenities. The food court was also extensively renovated, complete with new tables and seating. Likewise, the fountain near the elevator was removed to maximize seating area for the food court and the glass elevator itself refurbished. In 2012–2013, even more changes are afoot as a new wing, anchored by a 12-screen Cinemark Theatres and additional in-line shops, is under development on the former JCPenney pad site.

As of March 5, 2015, CBL & Associates Properties officials announced their continued commitment to Monroeville Mall with a multimillion-dollar renovation project slated to begin later that month. Renovations will include "a comprehensive refreshing of the mall's interior, including a new color scheme of muted tones of blue, gray and brown. The existing lighting will be removed, and new contemporary sconces will brighten the common areas. Sleek stainless steel railings will line the walkways. In addition, customers will discover new groupings of soft seating, designed for relaxing and chatting. Upgrading the restrooms is also on the schedule, with new tile, granite and cherry wood finishes. New furniture and finishes in the Food Court will reflect the overall contemporary new design. The mall's exterior will also be enhanced with new benches and receptacles." This project is designed to "focus on offering shoppers a welcoming, vibrant destination to shop, dine and spend time with family and friends."

2015 shooting
On February 7, 2015, a juvenile later identified as 17-year-old Tarod Thornhill entered the men's department on the lower level of Macy's department store about 7:30 p.m. and shot his intended target and two bystanders, leaving two with critical injuries. Victims were sent to nearby Forbes Hospital. Among the witnesses were NFL Wide Receiver Terrelle Pryor, who tweeted about the incident afterward.

As a result of this incident, the mall has instituted a youth escort policy which requires all youths 18 and under to be escorted by a parent or guardian 21+ on Fridays and Saturdays from 6 p.m. to close.

Mall management, Monroeville police, and Allegheny County have pledged to work together to secure the future of the mall and the community by implementing further security measures, which "will include — but not be limited to — increased installation of security cameras and video surveillance." Despite the negative attention the mall has received, municipal leaders continue to stress that "Monroeville Mall is a very safe, family-oriented," destination which continues to anchor the largest concentration of businesses and commerce in the eastern suburbs of the Pittsburgh Metropolitan Area.

In popular culture 
The Monroeville Mall has been used as a location in films and other media forms.

Dawn of the Dead 
The Monroeville Mall is most famous as the filming location for the 1978 movie Dawn of the Dead, directed by George A. Romero. In 1977, George A. Romero began filming Dawn of the Dead on location at the Monroeville Mall. All filming inside the mall took place at night after the mall had closed, with filming often continuing until dawn. Filming inside the mall began in October 1977, but had to be suspended when Christmas decorations were hung shortly after Thanksgiving. Filming resumed in January after the decorations were removed. It was during that break that much of the mall's exterior shots were filmed, as well as filming at other locations. In the film's storyline, the mall was used as a fortress to protect four human survivors from a world taken over by the walking dead. Several pictures taken during the filming are on display in a room on the upper level near Macy's. In addition, Monroeville Zombies, located on the lower level near Macy's, featured an in-store museum and gift shop dedicated to celebrating zombies in film and pop culture. The museum's main focus was Dawn of the Dead and contained artifacts, memorabilia, scale models of the mall as depicted in the movie and a boiler room walk through with various life-sized replicas of movie zombies. In 2013, the museum was relocated to Evans City, PA, home of the original film Night of the Living Dead. In October of 2020 the Living Dead Museum relocated back to the Monroeville Mall and is located on the upper level.

Other films 
 The ice skating rink at the Monroeville Mall appears in the 1983 film Flashdance as the rink on which Jeanne auditions.
 Some scenes from the film Zack and Miri Make a Porno, directed by Kevin Smith, were filmed in the mall.
 In the 1984 children's fantasy film The Boy Who Loved Trolls, 12-year-old Paul is seen wandering through the halls of the mall as shots of many long-gone storefronts such as the Candy Tree are shown.

In television shows 
 Episode 1483 of Mister Rogers' Neighborhood, Chef Brockett participated in a cake decorating contest that was filmed in the location of the old fountain court at the Monroeville Mall.
 In Season 2, Episode 5 of the Netflix series Mindhunter, one of the entrances at the Monroeville Mall was used as an entrance of the San Francisco International Airport.
 During the 2021 WWE Pay per view WrestleMania Backlash during the zombie lumberjack match, Monroeville native Corey Graves, said that, "he had flashbacks to the Monroeville Mall,"  a direct reference to the mall being the filming location of Dawn of the Dead.

In literature 
 Stephen King's 1983 novel Christine takes place in the fictional suburb of Libertyville, Pennsylvania, which is adjacent to Monroeville. The Monroeville Mall is mentioned repeatedly.

In music 
 The song "Early Sunsets over Monroeville" by My Chemical Romance, from their debut album I Brought You My Bullets, You Brought Me Your Love, invokes the Monroeville Mall; vocalist Gerard Way describes it as "a sweet song about Dawn of the Dead."

Anchor stores 
The Monroeville Mall's original anchor tenants at its opening in May 1969 were the Pittsburgh-based Joseph Horne Company, Gimbels, and JCPenney (then Penney's). A freestanding Montgomery Ward store would also arrive in the 1970s; however, it would close by the mid-1980s as part of a restructuring plan at the time.

In 1970, the entire Gimbels chain was purchased by the tobacco conglomerate BATUS. In 1986, after years of declining sales, BATUS announced that Gimbels was on the block. Unable to find a buyer for the entire chain, BATUS closed down the entire Gimbels Pittsburgh division, selling or closing all locations. Some of the more attractive mall locations, such as the Monroeville Mall, were taken over by the St. Louis-based May Department Stores Company for its Pittsburgh-based Kaufmann's division. This effectively caused the shuttering of the entire Gimbels Pittsburgh division. The Monroeville Mall location was closed, completely renovated and expanded into the building's unused third floor, before reopening as Kaufmann's. In 2006, when the May Department Stores Company was purchased by Cincinnati-based Federated Department Stores, this store was acquired by Boscov's, as Macy's was already located in the former Horne's location at the opposite end of the mall. In October 2008, Boscov's closed their Monroeville store as part of a bankruptcy plan.

The Joseph Horne Company, owned by the New York City-based Associated Dry Goods Corporation, operated in Monroeville Mall until 1994. It would be renovated and expanded, utilizing the store's unused third floor, over the course of its operation through the years. In October 1986, the May Department Stores Company merged with Associated Dry Goods. May promptly sold the Horne's chain to a group of local investors. In 1995, Federated Department Stores acquired Horne's and renamed all former locations under its own Lazarus regional nameplate. In 2005, Federated eventually merged all its divisions (including the former Joseph Horne/Lazarus locations) into Macy's as part of a nationwide rebranding program.

JCPenney was the last original anchor at the Monroeville Mall. From 1969–2012, it operated its original store in the center of the mall; however, by late 2012 it opened in a smaller location on the upper two levels of the former Boscov's building, as the existing department store anchor was demolished to make way for the 12-screen Cinemark Theatres and in-line shops, which opened in the fall of 2013. H&M has also committed to a new location at Monroeville Mall; it opened in the summer of 2013 on the lower level of the former JCPenney pad site. Dick's Sporting Goods relocated from outside the mall to the lower level of the former Boscov's in the summer of 2014. Macy's Backstage opened in 2018.

On June 4, 2020, it was announced that JCPenney would be closing as part of a plan to close 154 stores nationwide. However, on July 9, 2020 it was removed from the closing list, so it will remain open for now.

References

External links 

 

Shopping malls in Metro Pittsburgh
CBL Properties
Shopping malls established in 1969
Buildings and structures in Allegheny County, Pennsylvania
Tourist attractions in Allegheny County, Pennsylvania
1969 establishments in Pennsylvania